Sainte-Soulle is a commune in the Charente-Maritime department in the Nouvelle-Aquitaine region in southwestern France.

Geography

It is traversed by the N11 (La Rochelle - Paris), which can be accessed at the Usseau roundabout.  At the Usseau roundabout, the route connecting La Rochelle with Nantes (N137) branches off the N11. The future highway A831 (Fontenay-le-Comte—Rochefort) will pass through the commune.

Apart from the village Sainte-Soulle, the commune consists of the localities Les Grandes-Rivières, Les Petites-Rivières, Saint-Coux, part of Fontpatour, le Treuil-Arnaudeau, Usseau, La Gabardelière, Chavagne and Le Raguenaud.

Formerly an agricultural commune, it became urbanized in the 1990s and many of its residents are now employed in nearby La Rochelle.

History
The name of the commune comes from the local saint Soline (see also the commune of Sainte-Soline in the Deux-Sèvres department).

Population

See also
Communes of the Charente-Maritime department

References

Communes of Charente-Maritime
Charente-Maritime communes articles needing translation from French Wikipedia